Lin Kai-ling (born 21 September 1991) is a Taiwanese footballer who plays as a defender for Taiwan Mulan Football League club Hualien FC. She has been a member of the Chinese Taipei women's national team.

International goals

References

1991 births
Living people
Women's association football defenders
Taiwanese women's footballers
Chinese Taipei women's international footballers
Asian Games competitors for Chinese Taipei
Footballers at the 2014 Asian Games
Footballers at the 2018 Asian Games